Smoke Signals is a studio album by American R&B singer Smokey Robinson, released in 1986 by Motown.

Track listing
All tracks composed by Smokey Robinson; except where indicated
	"Some People (Will Do Anything for Love)" (Bobby Sandstrom, Michael Price) -	4:22
	"Sleepless Nights" (Alan Gorrie, Michael Mugrage) -	4:07
	"Because of You (It's The Best It's Ever Been)" - 4:12
	"Be Kind to the Growing Mind" (featuring the Temptations) - 4:45
 "Te Quiero Como Si No Hubiera Un Mañana (I'm Gonna Love You Like There's No Tomorrow)" (Smokey Robinson, Ivory Stone, Mark Davis) - 4:21
	"Hold On to Your Love" (Smokey Robinson, Stevie Wonder) -	5:12
	"Photograph in My Mind" (J.C. Crowley, Tom Campbell) - 3:51
 "No Time to Stop Believing" (Don Black, Simon Climie) - 4:11
	"Wishful Thinking" (Bobby Sandstrom, Michael Price, David Paul Bryant) -	4:05
 "Hanging On by a Thread" (Smokey Robinson, Mark Davis) -	3:45

Personnel
 Smokey Robinson – lead vocals
 Bobby Sandstrom – synthesizers (1, 9), bass (1), drum programming (1, 9), backing vocals (1), BGV arrangements (1), keyboards (9), arrangements (9)
 John Hobbs – keyboards (2, 10),  synthesizers (2, 10), arrangements (2, 10), acoustic piano (4, 5)
 Jim Lang – keyboards (3, 6), synthesizers (3), arrangements (3, 6), bass (6), drum programming (6)
 Michael Boddicker – arrangements (4), synthesizers (5)
 Michael Omartian – arrangements (4), additional keyboards (6), additional synthesizer (6)
 Tony Peluso – arrangements (2, 3, 4), additional synthesizer (5), guitar solo (9, 10)
 Robbie Buchanan – synthesizer solo (5), synthesizers (7, 8), bass (7, 8), drum programming (7, 8), arrangements (7, 8)
 Paul Jackson Jr. – guitar (1-9)
 Neil Stubenhaus – bass guitar (2, 4, 5, 9, 10)
 Mike Baird –  drums (2, 6, 10)
 John Robinson – drums (3, 4, 5)
 Freddy Alwag – drum programming (3)
 Vinnie Colaiuta – drums (7, 8)
 Paulinho Da Costa – percussion (1, 2, 5, 9)
 Steve Barri – additional percussion (2, 5), percussion (4)
 Greg Adams – horn arrangements (1, 9)
 Tower of Power Horns (Emilio Castillo, Greg Adams, Mike Cichowicz, Richard Elliot, Stephen Kupka) – horns (1, 9)
 Richard Elliot – lyricon solo (2, 3), saxophone (8)
 Calvin Davis –  alto saxophone (5)
 Michael Jacobsen – tenor saxophone (5)
 Fred Smith – tenor saxophone (5)
 Herb Alpert – trumpet solo (5)
 Mark Davis – arrangements (3, 5)
 Stevie Wonder – arrangements (6)
 David Bryant – arrangements (9)
 Michael Lovesmith – backing vocals (1, 2, 10), BGV arrangements (1)
 Maureen Steele – backing vocals (1, 2)
 Richard Carpenter – backing vocals (2, 10), BGV arrangements (2, 10), additional keyboards (10)
 Brenda Eager – backing vocals (3, 5, 6), additional backing vocals (4) 
 Patricia Henley – backing vocals (3, 5, 6), additional backing vocals (4)
 Ivory Stone – backing vocals (3, 5, 6, 9), additional backing vocals (4)
 The Temptations – backing vocals (4)
 Bunny DeBarge – backing vocals (6)
 Mark DeBarge – backing vocals (6)
 Howard Smith – backing vocals (6)
 Phillip Ingram – backing vocals (7, 8)
 Dennis Lambert – backing vocals (7, 8)
 Darryl Phinnessee – backing vocals (7, 8)
 Oren Waters – backing vocals (7, 8)
 Julie Waters – backing vocals (9)
 Maxine Waters – backing vocals (9)

Production 
 Producers – Steve Barri (Tracks 1-10); Tony Peluso (Tracks 1-6, 9 & 10); Mark Davis (Track 5); Smokey Robinson (Track 5); Dennis Lambert (Tracks 7 & 8).
 Co-Producer on Tracks 7 & 8 – Robbie Buchanan
 Executive Producer – Steve Barri 
 Engineers – Tony Peluso (Tracks 1-6, 9 & 10); Dennis McKay and Jack Joseph Puig (Tracks 7 & 8).
 Second Engineers – Sabrina Buchanek (Tracks 1-6, 9 & 10); Bino Espinoza (1-10); Toni Greene (Tracks 1-6, 9 & 10); Karen Siegel (Tracks 1-6, 9 & 10); Steve Ford (Tracks 7 & 8).
 Recorded at Hitsville U.S.A. Recording Studios (Hollywood, CA); Monkey Dust Studio (Granada Hills, CA); Soundcastle Studio Center (Los Angeles, CA).
 Mixing – Tony Peluso (Tracks 1-6, 9 & 10); Jack Joseph Puig (Tracks 7 & 8).
 Mixed at Mama Jo’s Recording Studio (Hollywood, CA).
 Mastered by Steve Hall at Future Disc (Hollywood, CA).
 Album Coordinator – Gail Pierson 
 Art Direction – Johnny Lee
 Design – Janet Levinson
 Photography – Ron Slenzak

References

1986 albums
Smokey Robinson albums
Motown albums